The Latvia's First Party was a socially conservative, Christian-democratic right-wing political party in Latvia.  It merged with Latvian Way to form Latvia's First Party/Latvian Way in 2007.

It was founded on 25 May 2002, led by Ēriks Jēkabsons and Ainārs Šlesers. The party included a number of priests from all the major branches of Christianity in Latvia (Lutheran, Catholic, Orthodox and Baptist) as well as members  of Jaunā Paaudze (New Generation), a controversial charismatic group. As a result, it was informally nicknamed "the party of priests" or the "pastors' party".

Using populist promises and support from religious organisations, it won 9.5% of the popular vote and 10 out of 100 seats in the Saeima after the elections of October 5, 2002 and joined all the coalition governments since that time until its dissolution. In the 2006 elections, it ran together with Latvian Way; the bloc took 8.58% but also won 10 seats in parliament.  The parties merged in the following years.

Political positions

The party proclaimed itself to be a strong supporter of the traditional family. It sponsored a constitutional amendment that defines marriage as a union between a man and a woman, unambiguously excluding homosexual unions. Several prominent members of the party had been labelled as homophobic by its critics. E.g. Jānis Šmits who was appointed to the position of chairman of the Parliamentary Human Rights Committee has called his parliamentary colleagues to get familiar with religious writings "in case they can actually, read", quoting a passage from the Book of Moses that could be loosely translated as: "men having gay sex must die, and their corpses must be left soaking in their own blood". Additionally, Latvijas Pirmā Partija members had several times made public statements saying that they don't feel that there is a necessity for a gay pride march in Riga, which allegedly contradicts the Freedom of Speech and Peaceful Assembly enshrined in the Constitution of Latvia. The pressure group Mozaīka (Mosaic) have mostly organized Gay Rights Rallies that some religious organizations see as overt frontal attacks on the Latvian way of life. Mozaīka have stated that they have done this to raise awareness for the rights of gays in Latvia via international media. Between annual rallies Mozaīka has done little to slowly generate improved understanding of gays in Latvia and has preferred to follow its strategy of shock tactics. (articles 100 and 103).

Some have alleged that quoting the Bible as a reference point for legislation can be viewed as unconstitutional, since Latvia is a secular state, where religion is separate from the state (article 99 of the Constitution of Latvia). Supporters of the First Party denied that the "separation of church argument" can properly be used to keep people of faith silent when it comes to issues of morality or the passing or failing of laws that have strong moral dimensions. The ideas under the separation of church and state doctrine have to do with (a) the state not being allowed to control the church, or (b) the church not being allowed to control the state. All legislators have the right to vote their conscience.

Economically, First Party supported the existing status quo in Latvian economics. Compared to other parties, it was less concerned with budget deficits and believed that the government should do everything possible to stimulate economic growth, even at the cost of possibly running deficits. In its first parliamentary election in 2002, First Party also ran on an anti-corruption agenda. In the next election, it emphasized its competence and experience (in particular, the achievements of its leader, Šlesers, as the Minister of Transportation).

On ethnic relations, First Party was viewed as more Russian-friendly than most of the Latvian political parties. Most of the party's supporters were ethnically Latvian, but it does not attempt to appeal to Latvian nationalism and has a number of ethnic minorities among its voters. Recently, it created a "Russian centre" for its ethnically Russian members.

The leadership of the party included several prominent businessmen, most notably, its leader Ainars Šlesers. His critics attacked the First Party, saying that it was little more than a business project to further Slesers' interests in real estate business. His supporters pointed to many examples of improvement in Latvia's transportation infrastructure, including the airport and the national railroad.

Largely because of the influence of the First Party, a new cabinet-level ministry was developed, The Ministry of Children and Family Affairs. The position of Minister of Children and Family Affairs was held by Baptist pastor Ainars Bastiks from 2002 to 2009. This ministry has emphasized reducing the number of children in Latvia's orphan care system. One strategy has been the development and implementation of a new national foster care recruiting and training program, which has grown considerably every year since 2004. Another emphasis of this ministry has to do with the elevation of the importance of the "father" in Latvian society. The national holiday, "Father's Day" has been proposed with the corresponding encouragements for fathers to take their paternal responsibilities seriously. Stiffer penalties for "deadbeat dads" who avoid paying child support have been enacted.

Scandals
The first chairman of the party, Ēriks Jēkabsons, resigned as Minister of the Interior. Later, due to various disagreements about the direction that the party was taking, he left the party itself and became an independent MP.

Following the 2005 municipal election, a Jūrmala businessman Germans Milušs attempted to bribe the members of city council to ensure the election of Juris Hlevickis, a First Party member, as Jūrmala mayor. Hlevickis fell one vote short of becoming the mayor and, in 2007, both Milušs and Hlevickis were convicted and received prison sentences.

During the bribery attempt, Milušs's phone conversations were wiretapped by Latvian police. The wiretaps contain cryptic conversations between Milušs and Ainārs Šlesers, which were leaked to national TV in 2006. This resulted in the resignation of Šlesers as the Minister of Transportation on March 17, 2006. Šlesers was not however charged or convicted of bribery and returned to the position of the Minister of Transportation in November 2006.

References

www.emergingeuropemonitor.com
www.kommersant.com
www.latvians.com

External links
Official website
"Slesers forced to resign, coalition’s fate unclear", The Baltic Times, March 15, 2006.

Conservative parties in Latvia
Defunct political parties in Latvia
Christian political parties

de:Latvijas Pirmā partija